Steven Bullock is a footballer who played as a defender in the Football League for Oldham Athletic, Tranmere Rovers, Stockport County and Brisbane United in Australia's National Soccer League.

References

1966 births
Living people
Footballers from Stockport
Association football defenders
English footballers
Oldham Athletic A.F.C. players
Tranmere Rovers F.C. players
Stockport County F.C. players
English Football League players
English expatriate footballers
Expatriate soccer players in Australia
National Soccer League (Australia) players
Brisbane Strikers FC players